"Dark They Were, and Golden-Eyed" is a science fiction short story by American writer Ray Bradbury. It was originally published in the magazine Thrilling Wonder Stories in August 1949, under the title "The Naming of Names". It was subsequently included in the short-story collections A Medicine for Melancholy and S is for Space.

The story takes place on Mars in the near future, as is the case with many of Ray Bradbury's stories.

Plot summary
In the midst of a war on Earth, a spaceport in New York sends a group of colonists to establish a settlement on Mars. The Bittering family, composed of father Harry, mother Cora, and their children Dan (referred to as Tim in some versions), Laura, and David, arrives as part of the few colonists chosen for the first wave. Harry is initially disquieted by the Martian environment, but he takes comfort in the fact that the family can return to Earth when resupply ships arrive.

Strange events begin to affect the life brought as part of the settlement effort, including the seeded grass sprouting purple, the family cow growing a third horn in the middle of its head, and other anomalies with the vegetable garden. Harry's discomfort on Mars increases and the thought of returning to Earth on the next resupply mission soon becomes his only comfort, much to the concern of Cora. This comfort is taken away as Bittering is informed that the war has led to an atomic bomb devastating New York City and destroying the only spaceport capable of supporting travel. Frantically, he begins work on building a rocket to return himself and his family to Earth. As he works on the craft, the colonists themselves soon begin to manifest Martian traits. Harry notices that his own eyes have started to turn gold, and the townsfolk's skin turns to a dark reddish brown.

Cora convinces Harry that a family swim in the canals of Mars would do him good to relax, and he hesitantly agrees. While there, their eldest son, Dan, requests to be referred to by the Martian name Linnl. Harry and Cora, now almost entirely Martian, agree easily, and the other two children quickly adopt Martian names as well. As they return to the town, the Bitterings discover that the colonists are retreating to the ancient Martian villas in the mountains, as the summer has made the valley stiflingly hot. Harry briefly expresses a wish to stay and work on his rocket but is easily persuaded to go with the rest of the colonists and come back when the weather is cooler.

Five years later, the United States, having won the war and rebuilt New York, sends a small military dispatch to recover the colonists sent to Mars, only to find their settlement abandoned. The soldiers instead encounter a large Martian settlement in the mountain villas, where the native Martians are pleasant and have a remarkable affinity for English. Convinced they had nothing to do with the original colony's disappearance, the group agrees to attempt a second, larger settlement using the town built by the first.

References

External links
 

1949 short stories
Short stories by Ray Bradbury
Science fiction short stories
Works originally published in Wonder Stories
Short stories set on Mars